Han Gyeong-hee (Hangul: 한경희; born 9 July 1992) is a South Korean archer. She represented the Korean national women's team from 2009 to 2011.

Han was part of the women's teams that won the London Archery Classic, the test event for the 2012 Olympics, the 2011 Summer Universiade, the 2009 Youth Archery World Championships, and stages one and two of the 2011 Archery World Cup. She also won the individual championship of stage one of the 2011 Archery World Cup, and achieved a career high ranking of no. 2 in September 2011.

References

1992 births
Living people
South Korean female archers
Universiade medalists in archery
Universiade gold medalists for South Korea
21st-century South Korean women